Individualized Shirts is the first full-length album released by Pipes You See, Pipes You Don't of Elephant 6.

Track listing
All songs by Peter Erchick except where noted.

"Ten Thousand Years Old" – 4:00
"If I Leave Tomorrow" – 2:04
"Do Be Day" – :27
"Karaoke Free" – 4:09
"Pipes You See, Pipes You Don't" – 1:12
"I Am Instead" – 3:50
"Big Giant" – 2:25
"Million Pieces" – 3:24
"Moon River" – 2:17
Henry Mancini/Johnny Mercer
"Me and Bob" – 1:42
"Sleep Come Easy" – 3:38
"I Stopped With Victor Crowell To Feed The Ducks" – 3:45
"Pueblo" – 5:28

2001 debut albums